The men's C-1 1000 metres event was an open-style, individual canoeing event conducted as part of the Canoeing at the 2000 Summer Olympics program.

Medallists

Results

Heats
18 competitors were entered on 26 September. The top three finishers in each heat moved on to the final. Fourth through seventh-place finishers from each heat and the fastest eighth-place finisher advanced to the semifinal

Overall Results Heats

Semifinal
The top three finishers in the semifinal advanced to the final.

Kilingaridis's disqualification was not disclosed in the official report.

Final

References
2000 Summer Olympics Canoe sprint results. 
Sports-reference.com 2000 C-1 1000 m results.
Wallechinsky, David and Jaime Loucky (2008). "Canoeing: Men's Canadian Singles 1000 Meters". In The Complete Book of the Olympics: 2008 Edition. London: Aurum Press, Limited. p. 481.

Men's C-1 1000
Men's events at the 2000 Summer Olympics